United Nations Security Council Resolution 385, adopted unanimously on January 30, 1976, recalled previous resolutions on the topic as well as an advisory opinion of the International Court of Justice that South Africa was under obligation to withdraw its presence from the Territory of Namibia.  The Resolution reaffirmed the United Nations' legal responsibility over Namibia, expressed its concern over the continued illegal actions of South Africa and deplored the militarization of Namibia.

The Council then demanded that South Africa put an end to its policy of bantustans and its attempts calculated to evade the demands of the United Nations.  The rest of the resolution demands that South Africa promise to allow a UN-organized election to select a future government, release all political prisoners, leave Namibia and respect international law.

See also
 History of Namibia
 List of United Nations Security Council Resolutions 301 to 400 (1971–1976)
 South West Africa

References
Text of the Resolution at undocs.org

External links
 

 0385
 0385
 0385
January 1976 events